The 2021 Banja Luka Challenger was a professional tennis tournament played on clay courts. It was the nineteenth edition of the tournament which was part of the 2021 ATP Challenger Tour. It took place in Banja Luka, Bosnia and Herzegovina from 6 to 12 September 2021.

Singles main-draw entrants

Seeds

 1 Rankings are as of 30 August 2021.

Other entrants
The following players received wildcards into the singles main draw:
  Dražen Petrović
  Vladan Tadić
  Marko Topo

The following players received entry from the qualifying draw:
  Martín Cuevas
  Jonathan Mridha
  David Poljak
  Marko Tepavac

Champions

Singles

 Juan Manuel Cerúndolo def.  Nikola Milojević 6–3, 6–1.

Doubles

 Antonio Šančić /  Nino Serdarušić def.  Ivan Sabanov /  Matej Sabanov 6–3, 6–3.

References

2021 in Bosnia and Herzegovina sport
2021 ATP Challenger Tour
2021
September 2021 sports events in Europe